The Men's giant slalom competition at the 2017 World Championships was held on 17 February 2017.

A qualification was held on 16 February 2017.

Results
The first run was started at 09:45 and the second run at 13:30.

References

Men's giant slalom